"Song of Love" is a song recorded during an informal performance by Paul McCartney, singing and playing the piano at Twickenham Film Studios during the "Get Back Sessions" which were used to later produce both the Let It Be film and the album of the same name.

McCartney's lyrics for this song were inspired from the Song of Love (1947), starring Katharine Hepburn as Clara Wieck, which he combined with the music from Hungarian Dance No. 4 by Johannes Brahms. McCartney reused the opening sequence for "Maybe I'm Amazed."

Bibliography
Sulpy, Doug & Schweighhardt, Ray, Drugs, Divorce and a Slipping Image: The Complete, Unauthorized Story of the Beatles Get Back Sessions (The_910 Publishing, 2007) 
Sulpy, Doug & Schweighhardt, Ray, Get Back: The Unauthorized Chronicle of the Beatles Let It Be Disaster (St. Martin's Press, 1997)

External links
Song of Love (article from Beatlesong.info) "Information for Hardcore collectors of Beatles Music (Bootleg and Commercial Release)"

See also
Unreleased Lennon–McCartney songs
The Beatles outtakes
List of The Beatles songs

The Beatles songs
Songs written by Paul McCartney
Unreleased songs